Edoardo Lamberti (1895–1968) was an Italian cinematographer. During the 1920s he worked in Weimar Germany, but later returned to Italy.

Selected filmography
 Mister Radio (1924)
 The Game of Love (1924)
 By Order of Pompadour (1924)
 Hunted People (1926)
 The Beggar Student (1927)
 Rinaldo Rinaldini (1927)
 Weekend Magic (1927)
 Darling of the Dragoons (1928)
 The Insurmountable (1928)
 Marriage (1928)
 The Criminal of the Century (1928)
 Youth of the Big City (1929)
 Tempo! Tempo! (1929)
 The Black Domino (1929)
 Foolish Happiness (1929)
 Hungarian Nights (1929)
 Gentlemen Among Themselves (1929)
 Two Hearts (1943)

References

Bibliography
 Stewart, John. Italian Film: A Who's Who, McFarland, 1994.

External links

1895 births
1968 deaths
Italian cinematographers
Film people from Turin